Lucky Luke contre Joss Jamon is a Lucky Luke comic written by Goscinny and Morris. It is the eleventh album in the Lucky Luke Series and the second on which Goscinny worked. The comic was printed by Dupuis in 1958 and in English by Cinebook in 2011, under the title Lucky Luke versus Joss Jamon.

Synopsis
Joss Jamon and his gang plunder the town of Los Palitos while having Lucky Luke hanged. Nevertheless, the latter manages to obtain freedom in return for catching the bandits and bringing them back to Los Palitos; he promises to come back to be hanged if he fails.

Jamon and his gang arrive at Frontier City. There, they gradually take ownership of all the establishments of the city starting with the bank by threats. In the same way, Jamon manages to be elected mayor of the city and appoints his acolytes to key positions.

Nevertheless, Luke opposes Joss and his gang and does everything to make their lives difficult. He is captured and sentenced to hanging after a rigged trial.

Finally, the inhabitants rebel against Joss and his accomplices. They free Lucky Luke and fight the bandits entrenched in the saloon. Making them believe that the Army is here, they surrender. Joss Jamon tries to escape the city. Lucky Luke catches him in the desert and he delivers him with his accomplices to Los Palitos just when as deadline expires.

Characters 

 Joss Jamon's gang
 Joss Jamon: Leader of a band of demobilized southern soldiers, he decides to loot Frontier City by being elected mayor.
 Bill the Cheater: Appointed sheriff after the election of the latter, he cheats at cards.
 Jack the Muscle: Thick brute, he is responsible for intimidating the inhabitants of Frontier City before the election, then is named police officer afterwards.
 Joe the Indian: Indian wrapped in his red blanket, he is not talkative (5 times out of 6, he only says "Ugh") except when it comes to surrender (this time, his text takes up 28 lines and uses Latin phrases like "hic et nunc" or "ad patres"!)
 Pete the Wishy-Washy: Appointed by Joss Jamon to finance after the election of the latter to the mayor, he is also the judge at the trial of Lucky Luke; as his nickname indicates, he is quick to change sides (after his arrest, he is ready to testify against his accomplices).
 Sam the Farmer: "He benefited from an honest face", he is at the origin of the lawsuit against Lucky Luke in Los Palitos City. He becomes head of agriculture in Frontier City after Joss is elected mayor.

Cultural references
 The character of Pete is a caricature of René Goscinny.
 The man who comes to Luke's rescue, claiming nobody should "kill an old man" is a caricature of Jean Gabin.
 When the villagers are threatened to vote for Joss Jamon as their mayor, two people who are forced to vote at gun point are Red Ryder and Little Beaver from Stephen Slesinger and Fred Harman's comic strip Red Ryder.
 This story marks the first appearance of several Wild West legends who would return in later Lucky Luke stories: Billy the Kid, Calamity Jane and Jesse James, yet they are all drawn quite differently compared with later Lucky Luke stories. Also, Calamity Jane is incorrectly portrayed as a villain. 
The Dalton cousins (named Joe, Jack, Averell and Bill - Bill being William's diminutive - see page 23 of the hotel register) also appear, before being featured in the next album of the series.
Joss Jamon and his gang would later reappear in the hommage story Lucky Luke: Wanted (2021).

References

 Morris publications in Spirou BDoubliées

External links
 

Comics by Morris (cartoonist)
Lucky Luke albums
1958 graphic novels
Works by René Goscinny
Cultural depictions of Billy the Kid
Cultural depictions of Jesse James
Cultural depictions of Calamity Jane